, nicknamed "T-Ga", is a professional Japanese baseball player. He plays infielder for the Chiba Lotte Marines.

Career
He was the first draft pick for the Marines at the 2015 NPB draft.

Hirasawa signed with the Auckland Tuatara of the Australian Baseball League to play the first 5 weeks of the 2018/19 ABL season.

References

External links

 NPB.com

1997 births
Living people
Auckland Tuatara players
Japanese expatriate baseball players in New Zealand
Chiba Lotte Marines players
Nippon Professional Baseball infielders
Nippon Professional Baseball outfielders
Baseball people from Miyagi Prefecture